Tiago Miguel Silva Vilela Lima Pereira (born 3 June 1994) is a Portuguese footballer who plays for Pevidém S.C. as a central defender.

Club career
Born in Póvoa de Varzim, Lima Pereira's final youth club was FC Porto, and he was an unused substitute for the reserves in Segunda Liga for two matches in the middle of the 2012–13 season. He then joined another second team, Vitória S.C. B in the third division, winning promotion in his first year.

Lima Pereira made his division two debut on 9 August 2014, scoring the first goal in a 3–0 home win against C.D. Feirense. He added a further two during the campaign, in a ninth-place finish.

For 2016–17, Lima Pereira signed a one-year contract with Varzim S.C. in the same league. His uncle António had previously played for his hometown side.

Lima Pereira left his native Norte region for the first time on 23 June 2017, agreeing to a three-year deal at second-tier C.D. Cova da Piedade. He went further afield in January 2019, when he joined Eastern Sports Club of the Hong Kong Premier League on a six-month loan.

After leaving Cova da Piedade in 2020, Lima Pereira played at a lower level for AD Fafe, F.C. Felgueiras 1932 and S.C. Espinho.

Personal life
Lima Pereira's uncle, António, also played for Varzim and was a mainstay at Porto in the 1980s.

References

External links

Portuguese League profile 

1994 births
Living people
People from Póvoa de Varzim
Sportspeople from Porto District
Portuguese footballers
Association football defenders
Liga Portugal 2 players
Campeonato de Portugal (league) players
F.C. Felgueiras players
Padroense F.C. players
FC Porto B players
Vitória S.C. B players
Varzim S.C. players
C.D. Cova da Piedade players
AD Fafe players
F.C. Felgueiras 1932 players
S.C. Espinho players
Pevidém S.C. players
Hong Kong Premier League players
Eastern Sports Club footballers
Portugal youth international footballers
Portuguese expatriate footballers
Expatriate footballers in Hong Kong
Portuguese expatriate sportspeople in Hong Kong